The London Museum was a museum illustrating the history of London, England and one of two precursors to the present-day Museum of London.

History
It was inaugurated on 21 March 1912 by King George V with Queen Mary and Princess Mary and Prince George in temporary accommodation within the second-floor State Apartments at Kensington Palace. It opened to the public on 8 April, admitting more than 13,000 visitors during the day.

Two years after opening, the collections were moved to Lancaster House in St James's, and the museum remained there until World War II. The first Keeper of the museum was Sir Guy Francis Laking, and from 1926 to 1944 the Keeper was the archaeologist Mortimer Wheeler. During World War II, much of the collection was evacuated for storage at nearby Dover Street tube station, and later at Piccadilly Circus tube station. Some of the galleries at Lancaster House reopened to the public in 1942, but in November 1943 the building was requisitioned by the Ministry of Works as a conference centre and base for the new European Advisory Commission, the museum retaining only the basement for storage of its collections.

After World War II, attempts to reclaim Lancaster House for the museum's use failed. Eventually in 1948 George VI agreed that the museum might be accommodated once more in part of Kensington Palace, this time on the lower two floors, and it reopened there in July 1951. In 1975, under the directorship of Donald Harden, the London Museum was amalgamated with the City of London's Guildhall Museum to form the Museum of London, which opened to the public in a new building in the City of London in 1976.

References

External links
 Museum of London website

1912 establishments in England
Museums established in 1912
City museums in the United Kingdom
Defunct museums in London
Museum of London Group
History of the Royal Borough of Kensington and Chelsea